The 2019 Speed Energy Stadium Super Trucks Series was the seventh season of the Stadium Super Trucks series. Defending champion Matthew Brabham retained his title with a five-win season and a 54-point advantage over runner-up Robby Gordon.

The 2019 season saw the return of the trucks to Australia to finish the year, ending a year-long ban on the series by the Confederation of Australian Motor Sport (CAMS). This eventually led to the creation of the Boost Mobile Super Trucks championship for the 2020 season.

Drivers

Schedule

Season summary

The 2019 season began at the Circuit of the Americas in Austin, running as a support event to the IndyCar Series' IndyCar Classic. Continental AG's Continental Tire brand made its SST debut during the weekend, providing the TerrainContact A/T tire for four drivers and fielding a truck for Ryan Beat; two-time SST champion Sheldon Creed, NASCAR veteran Greg Biffle, and sports car driver Ryan Eversley also drove the truck during the season. Blade Hildebrand and Matthew Brabham won the weekend's races, the former recording his first career SST victory.

A week later, the series remained in Texas to join the Monster Energy NASCAR Cup Series' O'Reilly Auto Parts 500 weekend at Texas Motor Speedway; it was SST's first weekend as an undercard to strictly NASCAR events, and the third consecutive season it raced at the track. SST's racing, dubbed the Outdoor Powersports Offroad Rumble, saw Creed win both races. In the first event, Brabham, Robby Gordon, and Jeff Hoffman were involved in a wreck that saw the trio roll over on the ramp. The following race featured Bill Hynes rolling onto a barrier for a red flag; shortly after the event was halted, Gordon nearly collided with a safety vehicle attending to Hynes' truck, but braked on time; Gordon explained his radio with race officials had failed.

At Long Beach, Baja 1000 racer and SST test driver Zach Van Matre made his series debut, while Japanese driver E. J. Chiba returned to SST for the first time since Texas in 2018. In the first race, Brabham battled with Creed for the win, with the former securing the position with two laps left and holding on to the win. Gordon won the second round.

In July, the series returned to Honda Indy Toronto for the first time since 2016. NASCAR driver Casey Mears and Canadian driver Russell Boyle ran their first race of the year, while Eversley made his SST debut. Cole Potts won the first round after it was shortened due to weather, while Gavin Harlien won the second; with two second-place finishes, Brabham claimed the overall weekend victory.

On July 27–28, SST competed at Mid-Ohio Sports Car Course for the first time, with Biffle and series veteran Arie Luyendyk Jr. making their first starts of the season. Biffle and Harlien battled for much of the first race before the latter fell back with mechanical issues. On the final restart, Potts took the lead from Biffle to win the round. Harlien started on the pole for the second race and led every lap. The series returned to the track two weeks later to support the NASCAR Xfinity Series' B&L Transport 170. Gordon won the Friday round and Brabham on Saturday.

At Road America, a pair of off-road racers in 14-year-old John Holtger and 19-year-old Christopher Polvoorde made their SST debuts. In the first race, Brabham made contact with Harlien on the final lap that sent the two into a spin that Potts capitalized on to win. Brabham and Harlien were involved in further battles in the second round until the former exited with mechanical failure, with the latter winning the second and third races.

Nine drivers, including four with stock car racing experience (Creed, Gordon, Harlien, and Mears), ran the Portland International Raceway weekend with IndyCar. Creed, in his first SST race since Long Beach, won the first round, while Brabham won race two. Kevin Savoree, head of Grand Prix of Portland organizer Green Savoree Racing Promotions, described the series as being a "fan favorite" that helped raise interest in the weekend.

In late October, SST returned to Australia for the Gold Coast 600 weekend at Surfers Paradise Street Circuit, consummating an agreement formed between the series and the Confederation of Australian Motor Sport (CAMS) to lift the latter's ban on the former in 2018. Reigning Dakar Rally champion Toby Price, Aussie Racing Cars driver Matt Nolan, former Supercars Championship winner Russell Ingall, and 2017 series champion Paul Morris returned to the series for the weekend, while Biffle joined for his first racing in Australia. In the first race, Price dominated by leading nearly every lap from the pole but was spun by Brabham in turn 11 on the final lap, leading to Gordon taking the win. The second race saw Morris battle with Potts for much of the event before the two collided at the white lap, which Brabham capitalized on to win.

Results and standings

Race results

Drivers' championship

Driver replacements

Notes

References

2019 in American motorsport